Jaime Heliberto Rosales Chirinos (born 8 June 1978) is a Honduran former football defender who last played for Platense.

Club career
Rosales started his professional career at Marathón and played for several clubs in the Honduran league. Also, he had a season with Guatemalan side Comunicaciones.
He joined Olimpia for the 2008–2009 season but moved to Victoria when deemed surplus to requirements by Olimpia after the 2009 Apertura.

He joined Platense for the 2012 Apertura championship.

International career
Rosales made his debut for Honduras in a March 1999 UNCAF Nations Cup match against El Salvador and earned a total of 20 caps, scoring 1 goal. He represented his country in 1 FIFA World Cup qualification match and was a member of the national squad at the 2000 Summer Olympics in Sydney. Rosales played for Honduras at the 1999 Pan American Games, scoring a goal versus Jamaica in a 2–1 victory.
He also played at the 1999 and 2001 UNCAF Nations Cups as well as at the 2003 CONCACAF Gold Cup.

His final international was an April 2007 friendly match against Haiti.

International goals

Honours
 CONCACAF Gold Cup Best XI (Reserves): 2003

References

External links

1978 births
Living people
People from Yoro Department
Association football defenders
Honduran footballers
Honduras international footballers
Pan American Games medalists in football
Pan American Games silver medalists for Honduras
Footballers at the 1999 Pan American Games
Olympic footballers of Honduras
Footballers at the 2000 Summer Olympics
2001 UNCAF Nations Cup players
2003 CONCACAF Gold Cup players
C.D. Marathón players
F.C. Motagua players
Real C.D. España players
Comunicaciones F.C. players
C.D. Victoria players
C.D. Olimpia players
Platense F.C. players
Liga Nacional de Fútbol Profesional de Honduras players
Honduran expatriate footballers
Honduran expatriate sportspeople in Guatemala
Expatriate footballers in Guatemala
Medalists at the 1999 Pan American Games